Ingo Giezendanner (born 1975) is a painter and installation artist and member of the Kroesos Foundation.  He lives and works in Zürich, Switzerland.

Since 1998, Ingo Giezendanner, alias GRRRR, has been documenting the urban 
spaces in which he has travelled and lived. Apart from his native city of Zurich, his travels 
have taken him to diverse cities from New York and New Orleans to Cairo, Nairobi, 
Karachi and Colombo. Everywhere he travels, he captures his surroundings on location 
with pen on paper. His drawings have been presented in numerous magazines, books 
and animated films as well as in spacious installations and wallpaintings.

In conjunction with Mark Divo he painted the exterior façade on the squatted factory 
grounds Wohlgroth in Zürich in 1993. Since then, GRRRR has realized many wall 
paintings. During his stay in New York, he painted a mural on East 2nd Street. In 2004, 
he worked on a large-scale mural on a site hoarding at the Kunsthaus Zurich depicting 
the reconstruction in progress.

GRRRR has been presenting his work continuously in a series of publications. The first 
is the self-published booklet  “GRR1: video”, which appeared in 1998. The current book 
"GRR30: urban recordings" is his thirtieth publication. It contains drawings from the 
years 1998 to 2006 which provide insight into GRRRRs entire work for the first time.

The production of animated films is a more recent development in GRRRRs work. 
In 2005, he produced several video clips for Swiss Television, among them the much 
noticed clip "GRR26: gib mer", a collaboration with rapper Big Zis.

Previous publications:

GRR5: Seattle / San Francisco (1999) 
Andreas Züst Verlag, 104 pages 

GRR8: Zürich (2002) 
Edition Patrick Frey, 72 pages 
 Out of print.

GRR20: Die Bau Zeitung (2004) 
edition fink, 40 pages

GRR23: DESIGN (2004) 
Nieves Books, 12 pages
www.nieves.ch Out of print.

GRR30: urban recordings (2006) 
passenger books, 356 pages

External links
GRRRR.net, the website produced by Ingo Giezendanner, showing most of his works
Passenger Books, publisher of Giezendanners book "GRR30: urban recordings"
Nieves, Publisher of Ingo Giezendanner's GRR23 and GRR41
Ingo Giezendanner listed at artfacts.net
Giezendanner at the Art Museum in Thun, Switzerland 2000
List of artists at the squatted Cabaret Voltaire (Zurich)
Kroesus.org

1975 births
Living people
20th-century Swiss painters
Swiss male painters
Swiss contemporary artists
21st-century Swiss painters
21st-century Swiss male artists
20th-century Swiss male artists